In Great Britain's National Hunt racing, the title of champion jockey is bestowed on the rider who has the most wins during a racing season. From its inception in 1900 to 1925, the award was given to the jockey who had the most winners during a calendar year. Beginning in 1926, this changed to most winners ridden during a campaign season; the 1926 winner was rewarded for the 1925–26 season, for example.

Tony McCoy was champion jockey a record twenty times. He also recorded the most wins in a season, with 289 in 2001–02. The title has been shared on three occasions: in 1944–45, in 1968–69 and in 1981–82. Three amateurs have won the title, though none more recently than 1919. One of them, Jack Anthony, won both as an amateur (in 1914) and as a professional (in 1922).  Racing was suspended for several years during World War II, which meant there was no championship in 1943 or 1944.

In the 2015–16 season, for the first time the championship was rewarded with prize money. The champion received £15,000 and smaller prizes were awarded down to fifth place. From 2016 onwards, the champion jockey receives a trophy designed by Asprey and chosen by McCoy, after the previous one was gifted to him upon his retirement.

Champion jockeys
Table legend

Records
Most titles - 20, Tony McCoy
Most consecutive titles - 20, Tony McCoy (1995–2015)
Most wins in a season - 289, Tony McCoy (2001–2002)
Most runner-up finishes - 17 Richard Johnson

See also
 British jump racing Champion Trainer
 British flat racing Champion Jockey
 British flat racing Champion Trainer

References

British jockeys
Horse racing in Great Britain
British Champion jockeys